Daniel Kinsman Coale (June 27, 1988) is a former American football wide receiver in the National Football League for the Dallas Cowboys and Indianapolis Colts. He played college football at Virginia Tech.

Early years
Coale was a versatile player for Head Coach Mark Gowin at Episcopal High School. He played wide receiver and defensive back, returned punts and kickoffs, while handling the place-kicking and punting duties.

As a junior, he registered 27 catches for 780 yards, 14 touchdowns and 4 interceptions, including one returned for a touchdowns

As a senior, he posted 27 receptions for 564 yards and 9 touchdowns, including two in kickoff returns. He was a second-team All-Met pick by The Washington Post, was listed as the No. 17 overall player on the Virginia 33 by SuperPrep, No. 21 player in the state of Virginia by The Roanoke Times and was a member of the SuperPrep Mid-Atlantic Team. He also earned first-team All-state honors as a lacrosse player.

He finished his prep career with 109 catches for 2,367 yards and 33 touchdowns, earning All-state honors three-straight seasons, including first-team honors in his last two years.

College career
Coale accepted a football scholarship from Virginia Tech. As a redshirt freshman he started 14 games, collecting 36 receptions (led the team) for 408 receiving yards (second on the team).

As a sophomore, he started in 12 out of 13 games, making 30 receptions for 614 yards and 2 touchdowns. Against the University of Nebraska, his 81-yard reception in the final 90 seconds of the game set up the winning touchdown.

As a junior he started every game, recording 39 receptions (second on the team), 732 receiving yards (second on the team), an 18.8-yard average (led the team) and 3 touchdowns. He tallied a career-high 143 receiving yards in the ACC title game against Florida State University, along with 6 receptions and a 46-yard catch.

As a senior he started every game, registering 60 receptions for 904 yards, 4 carries for 26 yards and 3 receiving touchdowns. He returned 8 punts for 52 yards (6.5-yard average). He also filled-in as the team's punter in 4 games, making 13 punts for a 43.5-yard average, including 4 punts over 50+ yards (a long of 61 yards), 3 punts downed inside the opponents 20-yard line and one touchback. He was the first Hokie to earn the ACC's James Tatum Award, for the conference's top senior football student-athlete. Against Boston College, he had a career-high 8 receptions for 118 yards. Against Georgia Tech, he was named ACC Receiver of the Week after making a 63-yard touchdown pass for a game-high 97 yards.

In the 2012 Sugar Bowl he was involved in a controversial call in overtime with the score tied at 20, when he made a diving catch that was initially ruled as a touchdown, but would later be overruled after a lengthy video review. The Hokies would miss the following field goal attempt, allowing the University of Michigan to hit a 37-yard field goal in the following drive to give them a 23-20 win.

Coale finished his college career with 165 receptions (second in school history), 2,658 receiving yards (second in school history), a 16.1-yard average and 8 receiving touchdowns. He graduated with a degree in Finance, Insurance and Business Law during the fall of 2010.

Professional career

Dallas Cowboys
Coale was selected by the Dallas Cowboys in the fifth round (152nd overall) of the 2012 NFL Draft. On June 11, he signed a 4-year deal receiving a base salary of $390,000.
 
He suffered a broken toe in a conditioning drill, which forced him to miss organized team activities and weeks of training camp. He was released on August 30 and re-signed to the practice squad on September 1, 2012. His season was cut short when he suffered a torn ACL on November 15, 2012 and was placed on the injured reserve list.

The next season, he experienced swelling in his repaired left knee, which set him back in training camp and was waived on August 30, 2013, before being re-signed to the practice squad. On September 16, 2013, he was waived to make room for Jamar Newsome.

Indianapolis Colts
Coale was signed to the Indianapolis Colts' practice squad on September 18, 2013, but was released on September 25, to make room for Da'Rick Rogers.

Pittsburgh Steelers
He was signed to a reserve/future contract by the Pittsburgh Steelers on January 28, 2014. After suffering a displaced finger fracture, he was waived with an injury designation on August 5 to make room for James Shaw. On January 1, 2015, he was re-signed to the practice squad.

Personal life
Coale is the son of Jimmy Coale, professor of physical education and head strength and conditioning coach at Virginia Military Institute and his wife, Kathy. He is one of three boys, with two brothers, Kevin, a former University of Virginia lacrosse player, and Ryan, a baseball player. He is the son-in-law of former NFL offensive tackle Tunch Ilkin.

References

External links
Virginia Tech Hokies bio

1988 births
Living people
American football wide receivers
Dallas Cowboys players
Indianapolis Colts players
People from Lexington, Virginia
Pittsburgh Steelers players
Players of American football from Virginia
Virginia Tech Hokies football players